Vani (1912–1988) was a Kannada writer. She was born in Srirangapatna (near Mysore). Her father B. Narasinga Rao was an advocate. She was bestowed the "Rajaseva Saktha" title by Nalvadi Krishna Raja Wodeyer of Mysore Palace. Three of her novels — Shubhamangala, Eradu Kanasu and Hosa Belaku — were made into successful Kannada movies directed by top Kannada directors.

Novels 

 Bidugade
 Chinnada Panjara
 Mane Magalu
 Avala Bhagya
 Kaveria Madilalli
 Anjali
 Baleya Neralu
 Anireekshita
 Ale Nele
 Shishiragana
 Hoovu mullu
 Premasethu
 Trishula
 Sulgna Savadhana
 Bale
 Hosa Belaku
Eradu Kanasu
Shubhamangala

Story collections (Kathaa Sankalana) 
 Kasturi
 Arpane
 Naneya maduve
 Aparupada Attithi
 Babu Bharthane
 Happy Birthday

Vachana Sangraha 
 Navanitha

Awards 
 1962 – Karnataka State Award.
 1972 – Karnataka Sahitya Academy Award

References 

Kannada-language writers
1912 births
People from Mandya
1988 deaths